The TurkuaZoo also called Sealife is a public aquarium located in Bayrampaşa in Istanbul, Turkey. It was the first public aquarium in Turkey, and is one of the largest aquariums in Europe. In addition to being a major tourist attraction for Istanbul, the aquarium is a centre for marine research and conservation.

References

External links

Tourist attractions in Istanbul
Buildings and structures in Istanbul
Aquaria in Istanbul
Tourism in Istanbul
2009 establishments in Turkey
Bayrampaşa